The following is a list of pipeline accidents in the United States in 1968. It is one of several lists of U.S. pipeline accidents. See also: list of natural gas and oil production accidents in the United States.

Incidents 

This is not a complete list of all pipeline accidents. For natural gas alone, the Pipeline and Hazardous Materials Safety Administration (PHMSA), a United States Department of Transportation agency, has collected data on more than 3,200 accidents deemed serious or significant since 1987.

A "significant incident" results in any of the following consequences:
 Fatality or injury requiring in-patient hospitalization.
 $50,000 or more in total costs, measured in 1984 dollars.
 Liquid releases of five or more barrels (42 US gal/barrel).
 Releases resulting in an unintentional fire or explosion.

PHMSA and the National Transportation Safety Board (NTSB) post-incident data and results of investigations into accidents involving pipelines that carry a variety of products, including natural gas, oil, diesel fuel, gasoline, kerosene, jet fuel, carbon dioxide, and other substances. Occasionally pipelines are re-purposed to carry different products.

The following incidents occurred during 1968:
 1968 On the night of January 8, a City Water crew in Reading, Pennsylvania snagged a 3/4 inch gas line, causing it to pull out of a gas main fourteen feet away. About two hours later, there was an explosion that destroyed two nearby semi-detached homes, killing nine people in those structures.
 1968 A petroleum products pipeline was found to be leaking on January 27, near Kokomo, Mississippi. Damage to cotton crops and water wells was discovered soon after.
 1968 On January 30, a 4 inch gas main that was leaking triggered an explosion that killed 7, injured 17, and destroyed nearby building, in Pittsburgh, Pennsylvania. Gas company workers had been removing sidewalk to find the leak before the explosion.
 1968 On March 15, a 30-inch high-pressure transmission line, near Edna, Texas, ruptured and caught fire. There were no casualties, but there was some property damage.
 Richmond, Indiana explosion: On April 6, 1968, natural gas leaking from a pipeline in Richmond, Indiana built up in a sporting goods store and exploded. Gunpowder in that store exploded later on. 42 people were killed, 150 were injured, and fifteen buildings were destroyed.
 1968 On April 15, a gasoline odor was detected at a drinking fountain in Glendale, California. The water well that fed the fountain was determined to be contaminated from an 8-inch pipeline that was leaking.
 On May 4, a propane pipeline ruptured & burned under the Mississippi River near Donaldsonville, Louisiana. 100 people were evacuated from nearby homes, but there were no injuries.
 1968 On May 8, A residence in San Jose, California, experienced a gas leak, followed by an explosion. Four houses were demolished, and over 20 others damaged. Several persons were injured. Damage to property was estimated at $1 million.
 1968 On May 29, a bulldozer ruptured a 1-inch gas service line at a children's nursery in Hapeville, Georgia. The bulldozer operator was unable to find the shutoff valve for the gas line, and shortly after there was an explosion and fire. Seven children and two adults were killed, and three children were seriously injured in the accident.
 1968 An 8-inch propane pipeline ruptured in a landslide near Plainfield, Ohio on June 1. Four different vehicles later drove into the vapor cloud, causing them to stall. One of the vehicle drivers tried to restart their vehicle, igniting the vapor cloud. Two people were killed, three others were injured by burns, and seven buildings and seven vehicles were destroyed.
 1968 On July 26, a worker was burned by a natural gas fire while working on a Sunoco gas pipeline in Gettysburg, Pennsylvania.
 1968 A contractor laying a new pipeline broke an old pipeline in Norwalk, Ohio on August 7, spilling gasoline for four hours into the Huron River.
 1968 On August 22, a 16-inch gasoline pipeline ruptured at General Mitchell Field, spilling almost  of gasoline, and forcing closure of one runway. Previous damage to the pipeline by heavy equipment working in the area was identified as the cause of the rupture.
 1968 A coal company digging machine hit an 8-inch LPG pipeline in Fulton County, Illinois on September 3, killing one person and injuring four others.
 1968 Two teen aged boys shooting a rifle ignited gasoline leaking from a petroleum pipeline pumping station, near Midland, Pennsylvania, on November 3. A large brush fire ensued. Both boys had moderate burns. A stuck relief valve on the pipeline was the cause of the leakage.
 1968 A MAPCO LPG pipeline, near Yutan, Nebraska ruptured on December 5. Repair crews responded to the pipeline rupture, and thought LPG vapors were dispersed, but ignited the vapor cloud by driving into it. Five repairmen were killed. After the accident, the Nebraska State Fire Marshal ordered MAPCO to reduce its operating pressure, and to hydrostatic retest  of that pipeline. During the tests, 195 longitudinal seams failed.
 1968 On December 18, a 30-inch gas pipeline exploded and burned at a gas processing plant in Gibson, Louisiana. One plant worker was injured.
 1968 On December 28, a crew was working an 8 inch gas pipeline to a 20 inch pipeline, near Bay City, Texas, when there was an explosion. Two persons of the crew were killed, and, four others injured.

References

Lists of pipeline accidents in the United States
pipeline accidents
1968 in the environment
1968 in the United States